is a Japanese sprinter specialising in the 400 metres. She competed in the 4 × 400 metres relay at the 2015 World Championships in Beijing and earlier won a silver medal in this event at the 2014 Asian Games.

International competitions

References

External links

1996 births
Living people
Japanese female sprinters
World Athletics Championships athletes for Japan
Athletes (track and field) at the 2014 Asian Games
Sportspeople from Shimane Prefecture
Asian Games medalists in athletics (track and field)
Asian Games silver medalists for Japan
Medalists at the 2014 Asian Games
21st-century Japanese women